The twelve glaciers on Mount Hood are:

References

Mount Hood glaciers
Glaciers
Mount Hood